The hundred of Black Torrington was the name of one of thirty two ancient administrative units of Devon, England.

The parishes in the hundred were:
Abbots Bickington; Ashbury; Ashwater; Beaworthy; Belstone; Black Torrington; Boyton (Cornwall) (part); Bradford;
Bradworthy;
Bridgerule;
Broadwoodkelly;
Clawton;
Cookbury;
Exbourne;
Halwill;
Hatherleigh;
Highampton;
Hollacombe;
Holsworthy;
Honeychurch;
Inwardleigh;
Jacobstowe;
Luffincott;
Milton Damerel;
Monkokehampton;
Northlew;
North Petherwin;
Pancrasweek;
Pyworthy;
Sampford Courtenay;
St Giles on the Heath;
Sutcombe;
Tetcott;
Thornbury;
Werrington and
West Putford.

See also 
 List of hundreds of England and Wales - Devon

References 

Hundreds of Devon